The  is a type of 2-6-4T steam locomotive built by the Japanese Government Railways and the Japanese National Railways from 1932 to 1947. A total of 381 Class C11 locomotives were built and designed by Hideo Shima .

Overview
The Class C11 was based on the earlier 2-6-4T Class C10 type built in 1930.

Preserved examples
52 Class C11 locomotives are preserved, as listed below, with six in working order.

Operational
 C11 123: Operated by Tobu Railway in Tochigi Prefecture. Operating as SL Taiju.
 C11 171: Operated by JR Hokkaido and based at Asahikawa Depot
 C11 190: Operated by Oigawa Railway in Shizuoka Prefecture
 C11 207: Operated by Tobu Railway in Tochigi Prefecture. Operating as SL Taiju.
 C11 227: Operated by Oigawa Railway in Shizuoka Prefecture.
 C11 325: Operated by Tobu Railway in Tochigi Prefecture. Operating as SL Taiju.

Static

 C11 1: Ome Railway Park in Ome, Tokyo
 C11 40
 C11 46
 C11 61
 C11 63
 C11 64: Umekoji Steam Locomotive Museum in Kyoto
 C11 66
 C11 75
 C11 80
 C11 96
 C11 131
 C11 133
 C11 155
 C11 167
 C11 180
 C11 189
 C11 191
 C11 195
 C11 200
 C11 209
 C11 210
 C11 217
 C11 218 static display outdoors in poor state at Haya Sohonten Yakiniku in Mikunigaoka, Sakai City as of June 2020 (see Google Maps streetview)
 C11 224
 C11 244
 C11 245
 C11 254
 C11 257
 C11 259
 C11 260
 C11 265
 C11 270
 C11 275
 C11 292: In front of Shimbashi Station in Minato, Tokyo. It blows its whistle every noon, 3 pm & 5 pm.
 C11 296
 C11 304
 C11 311
 C11 312: Oigawa Railway in Shizuoka Prefecture (used for spare parts). It made its final run on September 8th, 2007.
 C11 322
 C11 324: Umekoji Steam Locomotive Museum in Kyoto (cab section only)
 C11 331
 C11 351: Sendai General Shinkansen Depot in Rifu, Miyagi
 C11 367
 C11 368
 C11 372

See also
 Japan Railways locomotive numbering and classification

References

1067 mm gauge locomotives of Japan
Steam locomotives of Japan
2-6-4T locomotives
Hitachi locomotives
Kawasaki locomotives
Preserved steam locomotives of Japan
Railway locomotives introduced in 1932
Passenger locomotives